The premium tax credit (PTC) is a refundable tax credit in the United States. It is payable by the Internal Revenue Service (IRS) to eligible households that have obtained healthcare insurance by a healthcare exchange (marketplace) in the tax year. It can be paid in advance directly to a healthcare insurance company to offset the cost of monthly health insurance premiums.

The tax credit is part of a host of Affordable Care Act tax provisions, introduced by the IRS in 2014, and is meant to extend health insurance coverage to 18 million lower and middle-income Americans.

History

The eligibility criteria for the premium tax credit is determined by section 1401 of the Affordable Care Act (Obamacare). The Act was signed into law on March 23, 2010, and specified the credits are only available to individuals and families who have enrolled in a health plan offered on a healthcare exchange. On May 23, 2012, the Internal Revenue Service (IRS) adopted a regulation that said tax credits would be made available to eligible individuals who enroll in a health plan through either a state or a federally-facilitated exchange. The IRS based this on their interpretation of Section 1401.

On June 11, 2012 the IRS published Internal Revenue Bulletin: 2012-24 which obtains the final regulations that amend the Income Tax Regulations (26 CFR part 1) under section 36B relating to the PTC.

Four legal challenges were filed in four different states contesting the IRS regulation. The plaintiffs in all these challenges claim that a federally run exchange does not qualify as a health plan exchange and therefore cannot dispense premium tax credits. On July 22, 2014, the Fourth Circuit Court of Appeals and the Court of Appeals for the D.C. Circuit both issued conflicting opinions, with the Fourth Circuit confirming the validity of the IRS regulation in King v. Burwell, but the D.C. Circuit rejecting its validity in Halbig v. Burwell.

In November 2014 the IRS commissioner, John Koskinen, spoke at an AICPA conference. He said the IRS requested $430 million from the United States Congress to implement provisions required by the ACA. The IRS did not receive any money for this purpose and is now operating on a budget 7% lower than its 2010 budget. He mentioned two major provisions of this Act, the Premium tax credit and the individual shared responsibility payment as two new items that have to be implemented on 1040 tax forms.

For the 2015 tax year, 1.6 million taxpayers overestimated the amount they were supposed to receive for the advance tax premium. The average amount owing was $800, according to Politico.

Eligible households 
There are three factors that determine if a household is eligible to receive the PTC:
Household income 
Household size
State of residence

Individuals planning to use the filing status Married Filing Separately (MFS) are not eligible for the PTC.

Household income 
Income for the purpose of determining the eligibility for, and the amount of the PTC, is adjusted gross income (AGI) modified by adding non-taxable items, such as tax-free interest, non-taxable social security benefits and tax-free foreign earned income. The household income is the total of the modified AGI for all individuals in the household except those who are not required to file an income tax return.

Family size 
The proposed regulations (Internal Revenue Bulletin: 2012-24 published June 11, 2012) define a taxpayer's family as the individuals for whom a taxpayer claims a deduction for a personal exemption under section 151 for the taxable year, which may include the taxpayer, the taxpayer's spouse, and dependents.

State of residence 
The PTC is available to households whose income is between 100 and 400% of the Federal Poverty Level (FPL) for the tax year in the state where they reside. In some states, it is only available to those whose income is between 133 and 400% of the FPL.

Residents of Alaska and Hawaii have their own FPL tables whereas the other 48 states share a common FPL table. The FPL tables are updated annually in January.

Amount of the PTC 
There are four factors that determine the amount of the PTC:
Household income 
Size of household
Age of individuals making up the household
State county of residence

Calculation of the PTC 
The premium tax credit applies to households with an annual income of between 100% and 400% of the Federal Poverty Level (FPL) and is intended to limit the cost of health insurance (based on the Silver plan) to between 2% and 9.6% of the enrollee's household income, depending on income level.  Those at the lower end of the income range would receive the largest tax credit (and therefore pay the lowest percentage [i.e., 2%] of their income toward the cost of insurance premiums) while those at the higher end would receive a correspondingly lower tax credit and pay a correspondingly higher percentage [i.e., up to 9.6%] of their income toward the cost of premiums.

IRS forms

The IRS introduced several new forms connected with the Premium tax credit (PTC):

Form 8962, the Premium Tax Credit (PTC) must be filed with a 1040 income tax return by individuals who already received advance subsidies through a healthcare exchange. The form was released by the IRS on November 17, 2014, without accompanying instructions.
Form 8965, Health Coverage Exemptions
Three forms: 1095-A, 1095-B, 1095-C will be issued, respectively, by a health exchange, insurance company or an employer to taxpayers. The taxpayer will rely on these forms for proof satisfying the individual mandate. For the tax year 2014 only Form 1095-A provided by a health insurance exchange is required by the IRS.

References

External links
 https://www.irs.gov/pub/irs-pdf/i8962.pdf
 https://www.irs.gov/uac/The-Premium-Tax-Credit
https://www.irs.gov/irb/2012-24_IRB/ar05.html#d0e183 (Internal Revenue Bulletin: 2012-24 June 11, 2012)
 http://kff.org/interactive/subsidy-calculator/
https://web.archive.org/web/20141016191204/http://www.cbpp.org/files/QA-on-Premium-Credits.pdf (Center on Budget and Policy Priorities)

tax credit
Subsidies
Tax credits
Personal taxes in the United States